The Beatles' first English tour lasted from 2 February 1963 until 3 March 1963. The Beatles were fourth on an eleven-act bill headed by 16-year-old Londoner, Helen Shapiro. Other acts on the tour were the Red Price Band, The Kestrels, The Honeys (UK), Dave Allen, Kenny Lynch and Danny Williams. They were also joined briefly by Billie Davis during the latter part of the tour.

The tour was organised by the Arthur Howes Agency. This was the first time that the Beatles had worked with Howes.

Programme
The programme for the tour was:
Red Price Band
The Honeys
Dave Allen
The Beatles
Dave Allen
Danny Williams
  —Interval—
Red Price Band
The Kestrels
Kenny Lynch
Dave Allen
Helen Shapiro

Set list
The Beatles typical set list for the shows was as follows (with lead singers noted):

"Chains" (George Harrison)
"Keep Your Hands Off My Baby" (John Lennon)
"A Taste of Honey" (Paul McCartney)
"Please Please Me" (John Lennon / Paul McCartney)

Two other songs were used as prepared alternatives during the tour:
"Love Me Do" (Paul McCartney / John Lennon)
"Beautiful Dreamer" (Paul McCartney)

Winter 1963 Helen Shapiro Tour dates 
The Shapiro tour was split into two parts.

Part 1
The first part lasted from 2 to 10 February, although the Beatles did not play on the 10th, as they needed to be in London early on the 11th. The Beatles played two dates at the Cavern Club, Liverpool on 3 and 4 February, before joining the Shapiro tour again on the 5th.

All dates from Lewisohn

On 11 February, the Beatles recorded the ten tracks that, together with their two previously released singles, formed their debut album, Please Please Me.
From 12 to 22 February, they played a number of dates on their own, before joining the Shapiro tour again on the 23.

Part 2
The second part lasted from 23 February until 3 March. Travelling to Shrewsbury on 28 February 1963, Lennon and McCartney wrote the next Beatles single, "From Me To You".

All dates from Lewisohn

Instruments and equipment
Instruments The Beatles had on the tour, shown here for each member of the group.

John Lennon
1958 Rickenbacker 325 electric guitar
1962 Gibson J-160E electro-acoustic guitar (used as backup)
1962 Vox AC-30 amplifier

Paul McCartney
1961 Höfner 500/1 hollowbody Violin bass
Quad II/22 Amp modified by Adrian Barber
1962 Adrian Barber "Coffin" speaker cabinet

George Harrison
1957 Gretsch Duo Jet hollowbody electric guitar
1962 Gibson J-160E electro-acoustic guitar (used as backup)
1962 Vox AC-30 amplifier

Ringo Starr
Premier Mahogany drum kit
 20×17" bass drum
 12×8" rack tom
 16×16" floor tom
 14×4" Premier Royal Ace wood-shell snare drum

See also
 List of the Beatles' live performances

References 

Bibliography 

 
 
 

1963 concert tours
1963 UK Winter Tour
1963 in the United Kingdom
Concert tours of the United Kingdom
February 1963 events in the United Kingdom
March 1963 events in the United Kingdom